SS Said was an Egyptian cargo ship that the German submarine U-83 shelled and sunk on 8 June 1942 in the Mediterranean Sea  southwest of Jaffa, Palestine. Said was carrying 50 to 60 tons worth of general cargo including tobacco from Mersin, Turkey to Alexandria, Egypt.

Construction 
Said was built at the Cammell Laird & Co. shipyard in Birkenhead, United Kingdom in 1886. Where she was launched and completed that same year.

Sinking 
While Said was on her usual route from Mersin to Alexandria with 50 to 60 tons of general cargo including tobacco, she was spotted by the German submarine U-83 at 05.11 am on 8 June 1942. U-83 fired two torpedoes at her but both missed. After the failed attack, U-83 surfaced and barraged Said with 50 rounds from the submarines deck gun.

Wreck 

References

1886 ships
Steamships of Egypt
World War II shipwrecks in the Mediterranean Sea
Maritime incidents in June 1942
Ships sunk by German submarines in World War II
Ships of Egypt